Perumakkanallur is a village in the Papanasam taluk of Thanjavur district, Tamil Nadu, India.

Demographics 

As per the 2001 census, Perumakkanallur had a total population of 621 with 304 males and 317 females. The sex ratio was 1043. The literacy rate was 48.26.

References 

 

Villages in Thanjavur district